The Olympus Marathon is an international skyrunning competition held for the first time in 2004. It runs every year in Litóchoron (Greece) in June. The race is valid for the Skyrunner World Series.

Editions

See also 
 Skyrunner World Series
 Olympus Marathons

References

External links 
 Official web site

Skyrunning competitions
Skyrunner World Series
Mount Olympus